= Bujruk Tarlaghatta =

- Village
- Location in Karnataka, India Bujruk Tarlaghatta (India)
- Coordinates: 15°9′4.215″N 75°15′41.583″E
- Country: India
- State: Karnataka
- District: Dharwad

Population (2011)
  - Total: 3,458

Languages
  - Official: Kannada
- Time zone: UTC+5:30 (IST)

Bujruk Tarlaghatta is a village in Dharwad district of Karnataka, India.

== Demographics ==
As of the 2011 Census of India there were 743 households in Bujruk Tarlaghatta and a total population of 3,458 consisting of 1,772 males and 1,686 females. There were 389 children ages 0–6.
